Mount Manaia is a dominant landmark approximately 30 kilometres southeast of Whangarei city on the Whangarei Heads peninsula.

Standing 420 metres, the summit offers outstanding views of the Marsden Point Oil Refinery, Bream Bay and the Hauraki Gulf to the south, Whangarei Harbour to the west and the Poor Knights Islands and Northland coast to the north.

Mt Manaia - along with Mt Lion, Bream Head and the Hen and Chicken Islands, are the scattered remnants of andesite, volcanic intusions that erupted with force 16 to 22 million years ago during the early Miocene. They are part of a  stratovolcano that extended to the Hen and Chickens. Its jagged outline is similar to that of its neighbours and other volcanic outcrops in Northland that erupted in a similar period.

Today blanketed by native bush, Manaia's jagged peaks and steep bluffs are protected within a Department of Conservation reserve which features a well-maintained 1½ hour track to the summit.

Photo gallery

References

Sources
 Geological Society of New Zealand Annual Conference, 2-5 December 2002
 Te Ara Encyclopedia of New Zealand
 Northland Naturally, Mt Manaia web page

External links
 Whangarei Heads Tourism
 Department of Conservation - Mt Manaia Walking Track

Whangarei District
Volcanoes of the Northland Region
Miocene volcanoes